The Brisbane Wolves is a handball team from Brisbane, Australia. The best result at National Club Championship is fourth.

Records

Men
 Oceania Handball Champions Cup
4th Place - 2017
5th Place - 2016

 Australian Handball Club Championship
4th Place - 2017
5th Place - 2016

 Handball League Australia
4th Place - 2016, 2017

References

 Brisbane Wolves on Australian Handball League webpage

External links
Official webpage

Handball League Australia
Sporting clubs in Brisbane
Australian handball clubs
2016 establishments in Australia
Handball clubs established in 2016